The coaxial escapement is a type of modern watch escapement mechanism invented by English watchmaker George Daniels in 1976 and patented in 1980.  It is one of the few watch escapements which have been invented in modern times and is used in most of the mechanical watch models currently produced by Omega SA.

History
During the quartz crisis, English watchmaker George Daniels accepted a commission from American industrialist and watch collector Seth G. Atwood to create a timepiece that would fundamentally improve the performance of mechanical watches. As a result, Daniels invented the coaxial escapement in 1974 and patented it in 1980. The Atwood watch for Seth G. Atwood was completed in 1976.

Technical overview 
The coaxial escapement is a modification of the lever escapement with some features of the detent escapement. One of the few advances in escapement design which have been adopted since the invention of the lever escapement by Thomas Mudge in the 18th century, the coaxial escapement functions with a system of three pallets that separate the locking function from the impulse, avoiding the sliding friction of the lever escapement. This makes lubrication of the pallets theoretically unnecessary and thereby minimizes one of the shortcomings of the traditional lever escapement. In practice, a small amount of lubrication is used on the locking and impulse surfaces of the pallet stones, reportedly to minimize impact corrosion.

Critical virtue
The critical virtue of the Daniels escapement is the virtual elimination of the sliding friction component; i.e., the sliding of the pallet stones over the teeth of the escapement gear. What little sliding friction remains is due to the impossibility of maintaining an exact tangential geometry throughout the duration of an impulse.

Radial friction vs. sliding friction
By utilizing radial friction instead of sliding friction at the impulse surfaces the coaxial escapement significantly reduces friction, theoretically resulting in longer service intervals (though many factors influence this including lubricant aging) and greater accuracy over time.

Commercialization
The escapement was commercialized in 1999 by Omega SA when it introduced the first mass-produced watch incorporating the technology. It is the only escapement other than the Swiss lever escapement that is produced on an industrial scale. When it first came to the market as the Caliber 2500, it had an oscillation rate of 28,800 beats per hour (8 beats per second), considered a "hi-beat" movement. But the rate was reduced to 25,200 beats per hour (7 beats per second) in the Caliber 2500C. "While Daniels has recognized the advantages of higher beat movements, he has also noted that they aggravate the problem of sliding friction in the escapement (at the escape teeth and pallets). Higher beat movements produce increased speed and pressure at these critical surfaces."

References

External links
 Description and animation of Omega's co-axial escapement
 A technical perspective The co-axial escapement by Xavier Markl
 Questions in Time column about the history leading to the co-axial escapement by Professor J. C. Nicolet
 Clear images, and an animation, of the co-axial escapement by Siméon Lapinbleu
 line drawing animation of the daniels co-axial escapement Mark Headrick's Horology Page

Escapements